In Greek mythology, Amechania or Amekhania (Ancient Greek: Àμηχανίην) was the spirit of helplessness. She was regarded as a close companion (and sister) of Penia and Ptocheia. She was virtually identical to Aporia. Amechania was mentioned by ancient Greek authors such as Alcaeus and Herodotus.

Notes

References 

 Herodotus, The Histories with an English translation by A. D. Godley. Cambridge. Harvard University Press. 1920. . Online version at the Topos Text Project. Greek text available at Perseus Digital Library.

Greek goddesses
Personifications in Greek mythology